Tihomir "Tim" Orešković (born 1 January 1966) is a Croatian Canadian businessman who was Prime Minister of Croatia from January to October 2016.

Born in Zagreb, Orešković emigrated to Canada at a young age and spent most of his life there. He studied at McMaster University and graduated with a B.Sc. in chemistry in 1989 and an MBA in finance and information systems in 1991. Before taking office as Prime Minister, Orešković served as CEO and Chairman of the Supervisory Board of Croatian pharmaceutical giant Pliva, as head of European financial management for Israeli Teva Pharmaceutical Industries, and as Chief Financial Officer for Teva's division of global generics.

In the aftermath of a parliamentary election held on 8 November 2015 where no party secured enough seats necessary to form government, and the ensuing 76 days of negotiations, Orešković was named as a technocratic non-partisan compromise for the post of Prime Minister by the Croatian Democratic Union (HDZ) and the coalition Bridge of Independent Lists (Most) on 23 December 2015. He was formally named Prime Minister-designate on the same day by President Kolinda Grabar-Kitarović. Orešković formed the 13th Croatian Government, made up of two deputy prime ministers and 20 ministers on 22 January 2016.

As Prime Minister, Orešković introduced fiscal controls aimed at reducing public expenditures and lowering the public debt and deficit. However, his government was marked by tense relations between the two governing parties, with political maneuvering behind the scenes resulting in a government crisis in May 2016. Contrary to expectations that he would take direction from HDZ, the new Prime Minister showed his independence going against HDZ recommendations on several occasions. On June 16, 2016, the HDZ introduced a vote of no-confidence, which brought the government down and early parliamentary elections were called for September. Although Orešković initially considered running for re-election as a candidate of Most, he returned to the private sector. On 19 October 2016, Orešković was succeeded by the new Prime Minister, Andrej Plenković from the HDZ.

Early life and education
Orešković was born in Zagreb on 1 January 1966 to Đurđa and Dane Orešković. While he was still an infant, he moved with his parents to Hamilton, Ontario, Canada. In 1989, he graduated with a degree in chemistry from McMaster University in Canada. In 1991, he graduated with an MBA in finance and information systems from the same university. Orešković is married to Sanja Orešković (née Dujmović), also from Zagreb, with whom he has two daughters and two sons.

Professional career
His professional career began in 1992 in the production of American pharmaceutical company Eli Lilly where he held various functions in the field of finance and international business. His last position in the company was the position of Director for relations with the state administration and economic affairs.

After leaving Eli Lilly in August 2005, he continued his career in the Canadian pharmaceutical company Novopharm (now: Teva Canada), as VP of Business Development, Specialty Products and CFO. Orešković holds dual Croatian and Canadian citizenship.

Political career
Orešković was contacted by the Croatian Democratic Union (HDZ) several months before the 2015 parliamentary elections over a possible minister position in the new government. Following the parliamentary elections held on 8 November and the ensuring 76 days of negotiations during which a new Prime Minister could not be named, finally on 23 December 2015 it was announced that HDZ and Bridge of Independent Lists (Most) would name him as their compromise candidate for Prime Minister. On the same day President Kolinda Grabar-Kitarović handed him the mandate to try and form a government in the next 30 days. Orešković, a self-described fiscal conservative and a centrist, started forming his cabinet with the two parties in January. He named his cabinet on 21 January 2016 and the Orešković Cabinet was approved through a vote of confidence from Parliament on 22 January, constitutionally the last possible date of Orešković's 30-day mandate during which he was to name a government.

Prime Minister (2016)

The 13th Government of Croatia was approved by 83 MPs, 61 voted against and 5 abstained during the confirmation vote. Orešković's government included two Deputy Prime Ministers: Tomislav Karamarko, president of HDZ, who is the first deputy, and Božo Petrov, president of Most. Orešković's main tasks were to cut the public debt and bring investors to Croatia that had just emerged from a six-year recession. Orešković said that his government will achieve a GDP growth of above 3%, reduce the public debt below 80%, cut the unemployment rate to 14% and raise the country's credit rating. His plan included the privatization of non-strategic assets, more investments in tourism, energy and infrastructure, taxation of unused property and increased use of EU funds.

His government faced its first political challenge with the resignation of the Minister of Veterans Affairs Mijo Crnoja, only 6 days into his term, on 28 January 2016. His replacement, Tomo Medved was appointed as minister on 21 March 2016.

On 13 March, the Parliament adopted the 2016 state budget. The budget projected a deficit below 3% in 2016, GDP growth of 2% and the reduction of public debt from 86.9% to 86.8% of GDP. In mid April, the IMF increased the Croatian GDP growth forecast for 2016 from 1% to 1.9%. In the first quarter of 2016, revenues to the budget increased for 3.7%, and expenditures decreased by 6.5%. GDP growth was 2.7%.

On 22 April, representatives of the Jewish and Serb minorities and an anti-fascist group boycotted the official commemoration for the victims of the Jasenovac concentration camp, in protest to what they said was an inadequate reaction by the authorities to events that "downplayed and revitalized" the crimes of the Ustashe regime.

In June, Orešković and Economy Minister Tomislav Panenić signed contracts for onshore hydrocarbon exploration and exploitation with oil companies including INA and Vermilion Energy, worth €88 million. In case gas and oil is found in the exploration fields, located in Slavonia, it is estimated that revenues to the state budget would be between around €600 million (3,4 billion HRK) and €900 million (6,8 billion HRK) yearly. Orešković announced the first stage implementation of the Adria LNG terminal on Krk, the Križevci-Dugo Selo railway project worth €200 million, and the Pelješac Bridge worth €430 million. A new public procurement bill was adopted by the government, that replaced the lowest price criterion with the economically most favourable offer.

At the end of June, public debt was 3.9 billion HRK lower than at the end of 2015. June was also the fourth consecutive month of an annual decline of public debt. Budget deficit fell by 5.1 billion HRK in the first six months of 2016, making up 0.7% of GDP. GDP growth reached 2.8% in the second quarter.

Government crisis

Orešković's cabinet had been plagued by tensions between the two governing parties, HDZ and Most, particularly over the INA, Croatia's national oil company, and the Ministry of the Interior., which culminated in the conflict of interest affair labeled The Consultant Affair, when it was revealed that Tomislav Karamarko's wife had business contacts with a consultant of the Hungarian oil company MOL which was a party in an arbitration processes with Croatia over INA. As a result, a vote of no confidence against Karamarko was initiated by the Parliamentary opposition, asking for Karamarko to step down, which he refused to do.

On 3 June 2016, in an attempt to find a compromise solution for the growing crisis, Orešković called on both Karamarko and Petrov to resign their positions for the sake of stability of the country. Petrov was ready to do so, while Karamarko was not. Afterwards, HDZ initiated a vote of no confidence against the Prime Minister and started forming a new majority in the Parliament. Most continued to support Orešković and asked for Karamarko's resignation.

On 15 June 2016, the Commission for Conflict of Interest determined that Karamarko had been in a conflict of interest in The Consultant Affair, so Karamarko offered his resignation as Deputy Prime Minister while vowing to challenge the ruling at the Constitutional court. On the following day, the confidence vote in Parliament took place and resulted in the fall of Orešković's government by a vote of 125 MPs in favor, 15 against and 2 abstentions. Both the HDZ and most of the opposition voted in favor, while Most voted against. The fall of Orešković's  government led to the Parliament's self-dissolution on 15 July 2016, and early elections in the second half of 2016.

Orešković was Croatia's first prime minister not to be a member of a political party while in office and is also the wealthiest person to have held the position, with a reported net worth of around 22,2 million kuna (3,2 million US dollars) in late February 2016. Having held office for a little under eight months, he was the shortest-serving Prime Minister of Croatia since Hrvoje Šarinić in 1993 and his term was also the briefest since the replacement of a semi-presidential system with an incomplete parliamentary system in 2000. Orešković was the first, and to date only, Prime Minister to have been forced out of office by a parliamentary motion of no confidence.

References

External links

1966 births
Living people
Businesspeople from Zagreb
Politicians from Zagreb
Croatian emigrants to Canada
Naturalized citizens of Canada
McMaster University alumni
Canadian chief executives
Prime Ministers of Croatia